Hunting Season may refer to:
 The Hunting Season, the Haganah's suppression of the Irgun's insurgency against the government of the British Mandate in Palestine
 Hunting season, the time when it is legal to hunt and kill a particular species
 Hunting Season (2010 film), a 2010 Turkish film
 Hunting Season (2017 film), a 2017 Argentine film
 Hunting Season (web series), a 2012 American web-series